The 152nd Infantry Brigade (part of the 51st (Highland) Infantry Division) was an infantry brigade of the British Army that fought during both the First and the Second World Wars.

Formation
The brigade was raised in 1908, as the Seaforth and Cameron Highlanders Brigade, upon the creation of the Territorial Force (TF), the British Army's part-time reserve force, and was assigned to the Highland Division. The brigade was composed of the 4th, 5th and 6th Battalions of the Seaforth Highlanders and the 4th Battalion, Queen's Own Cameron Highlanders. It was formed as a result of the Territorial and Reserve Forces Act 1907.

First World War
The division was mobilised for service in early August 1914 and most of the men volunteered for overseas service. In mid-May 1915 the brigade was numbered as the 152nd (1st Highland) Brigade and the division became the 51st (Highland) Division and the infantry battalions received the '1/' prefix, 1/5th Seaforths for example, to distinguish them from their 2nd Line duplicates training as 191st (2/1st Seaforth and Cameron Highlanders), of 64th (2nd Highland) Division. In early May 1915 the division was sent to the Western Front.

Order of battle
The order of battle was:
 1/4th Battalion, Seaforth Highlanders (left November 1914)
 1/5th Battalion, Seaforth Highlanders
 1/6th Battalion, Seaforth Highlanders
 1/4th Battalion, Queen's Own Cameron Highlanders (left February 1915)
 1/6th Battalion, Argyll and Sutherland Highlanders (from April to June 1915)
 1/8th Battalion, Argyll and Sutherland Highlanders (from April 1915, left February 1918)
 1/6th Battalion, Gordon Highlanders (from June 1916, later became 6th/7th Battalion after merging with 1/7th Battalion)
 152nd Machine Gun Company, Machine Gun Corps (formed 16 January 1916, moved to 51st Battalion, Machine Gun Corps 19 February 1918)
 152nd Trench Mortar Battery (formed July 1916)

Second World War

The original 152nd Brigade, formed along with the division in 1908, was effectively destroyed when the 51st (Highland) Division surrendered during the Battle of France at St Valery-en-Caux on 12 June 1940. It was reformed in August 1940 from the 26th Infantry Brigade of the 9th (Highland) Infantry Division, formed as the 2nd Line duplicate of the 51st, which was renumbered as the 51st Division.

1939–1940
 4th Battalion, Seaforth Highlanders (destroyed 12 June 1940)
 6th Battalion, Seaforth Highlanders (until 30 March 1940)
 4th Battalion, Queen's Own Cameron Highlanders (destroyed 12 June 1940)
 152nd Infantry Brigade Anti-Tank Company (formed 28 January 1940, destroyed 12 June 1940)
 2nd Battalion, Seaforth Highlanders (from 30 March 1940, destroyed 12 June 1940)

1940–1945
 2nd Battalion, Seaforth Highlanders
 5th Battalion, Seaforth Highlanders
 5th Battalion, Queen's Own Cameron Highlanders

Campaign honours
 Battle of France – 1939-1940 (destroyed)
 Battle of El Alamein – 1942
 Operation Supercharge – 1942
 Operation Pugilist – 1943
 Operation Husky – 1943
 Operation Overlord – 1944
 Operation Astonia – 1944
 Battle of the Scheldt – 1944
 Battle of the Bulge – 1944/45
 Operation Plunder – 1945

Commanders
 Brig. H. W. V. Stewart
 Brig. I. K. Thompson
 Brig. D. N. Wimberley
 Brig. G. Murray
 Lt.-Col. J. Sorel-Cameron
 Brig. G. H. A. MacMillan
 Brig. J. A. Oliver
 Brig. A. J. H. Cassels
 Lt.-Col. D. B. Lang
 Brig. J. A. Grant-Peterkin

References

Sources
 

Infantry brigades of the British Army
Infantry brigades of the British Army in World War I
Infantry brigades of the British Army in World War II
Western Desert campaign
Operation Overlord
Military units and formations established in 1939
Army Reserve (United Kingdom)
Military units and formations established in 1908
Military units and formations disestablished in 1945
1939 establishments in the United Kingdom
Military units and formations of Scotland